Vitex divaricata is a tree shrub of the Caribbean native to Puerto Rico and the US Virgin Islands. Its Spanish vernacular names include higüerillo and higuerillo. Its English vernacular name is white fiddlewood.  It belongs to the order Lamiales. This tree is common in the Toro Negro State Forest.

References

divaricata
Trees of the Caribbean
Flora of Puerto Rico
Flora without expected TNC conservation status